Mennessis is a railway station located in the commune of Mennessis in the Aisne department, northern France. The station is situated on the railway lines from Amiens to Laon, and from Paris to Saint-Quentin. The station is served by regional TER Hauts-de-France trains to Saint-Quentin, Compiègne, Laon and Amiens.

History
The direct rail connection from Amiens to Saint-Quentin between the stations of Flavy-le-Martel and Montescourt (bypassing Mennessis) has been reopened in order to avoid switching at the busy station of Tergnier.

See also
List of SNCF stations in Hauts-de-France

References

Railway stations in Aisne